Ibrahim Gnanou (born 8 November 1986) is a retired Burkinabé football defender. Although primarily a centre back, he is also able to play full back on either side.

Career 
Gnanou began his career with ASFA Yennega and was scouted from Sheriff Tiraspol in January 2005. He is a very good header and he scored 18 goals in 86 matches for Sheriff. Gnanou was than transferred from Sheriff Tiraspol in Moldova to FC Midtjylland in Denmark in January 2008. In February 2009 left Denmark after one year and signed for FC Alania Vladikavkaz.

References

External links

1986 births
Living people
Burkinabé footballers
Burkina Faso international footballers
2010 Africa Cup of Nations players
2012 Africa Cup of Nations players
FC Sheriff Tiraspol players
FC Midtjylland players
Burkinabé expatriate footballers
Expatriate footballers in Moldova
ASFA Yennenga players
Expatriate men's footballers in Denmark
Expatriate footballers in Russia
Expatriate footballers in Gabon
FC Spartak Vladikavkaz players
Burkinabé expatriate sportspeople in Moldova
Russian Premier League players
Sportspeople from Ouagadougou
Association football central defenders
21st-century Burkinabé people
Santos FC Ouagadougou footballers
CF Mounana players
Rahimo FC players